Wangcun is a township in Fengqiu County in northern Henan province, China, located immediately north of the county seat. , it has 8 residential communities and 42 villages under its administration.

See also 
 List of township-level divisions of Henan

References 

Township-level divisions of Henan